Sydney Claude Thom (16 March 1889 – 11 September 1964) was an Australian rules footballer who played with St Kilda in the Victorian Football League (VFL).

Notes

External links 

1889 births
1964 deaths
Australian rules footballers from Victoria (Australia)
St Kilda Football Club players